Phetchaburi MRT station (code BL21) is a Bangkok MRT station on the Blue Line. It is located under the junction of Asok and New Phetchaburi Road. One can transfer to the Airport Rail Link at Makkasan Station, and SRT inter-city rails.

Station details 
The station uses symbol of a water wave referring to Khlong Saen Saeb. It is an underground station, 23 metres wide and 200 metres in length, with a depth of 20 metres, and uses island platform

There is also a MetroMall in the station.

Connection with ARL 
Phetchaburi station is connected to Makkasan station by a covered-elevated footpath. Fare and ticket systems between the two lines are not integrated.

References 

MRT (Bangkok) stations
Railway stations opened in 2004
2004 establishments in Thailand